Kalangala is a town in Kalangala District in the Central Region of Uganda. It is the headquarters of the district.

Location
Kalangala is on the northern shore of Bugala Island, the largest of the Ssese Islands in Lake Victoria. The coordinates of the town are0°19'17.0"S, 32°17'31.0"E (Latitude:-0.321389; Longitude:32.291944).

Overview
Kalangala is on the northern beach of Bugala Island, which constitutes the bulk (68.5 percent) of the land mass of Kalangala District.

Population
The 2002 national census estimated the population of the town at 2,950. In 2010, the Uganda Bureau of Statistics (UBOS) estimated the population of the town at 4,900. In 2011, UBOS estimated the mid-year population at 5,200.

Points of interest
The following points of interest lie within the town limits or close to the edges of town:

 Kalangala Information Center
 Kalangala central market
 offices of Kalangala Town Council

See also
* List of cities and towns in Uganda

References

External links
Kalangala Information Center

Populated places in Uganda
Cities in the Great Rift Valley
Central Region, Uganda
Kalangala District
Lake Victoria